William Jerome was a songwriter.

William Jerome may also refer to:

William Travers Jerome, US lawyer
William Jerome (martyr) (died 1540), English Protestant martyr

See also
William Jerome Coombs, U.S. Representative from New York